Habrodais grunus, the golden hairstreak, is a butterfly in the family Lycaenidae. It is found in North America in southern Arizona, Oregon, California and Mexico. The habitat consists of oak woodland, canyons and mountain ridges.

The wingspan is 25–32 mm. It has a short tail on the hindwing. The upperside of the males is dark brown with a yellow tinge in the cell area of the forewing. Females are less dark. The underside is yellow brown with a narrow, dark postmarginal line. The hindwings have thin gold crescents at the margin, the last two of which are iridescent. Adults are on wing from June to September in one generation per year. They feed on moisture from various sources and possibly also feed on aphid honeydew or other exudates.

The larvae feed on the young leaves of Chrysolepis chrysophylla, Quercus chrysolepis, Quercus vaccinifolia and Lithocarpus densiflorus.

Subspecies
Habrodais grunus grunus (California)
Habrodais grunus herri Field, 1938 (California, Oregon, Idaho)
Habrodais grunus lorquini Field, 1938 (California)

References

Butterflies described in 1852
Theclini
Lycaenidae of South America
Taxa named by Jean Baptiste Boisduval